Leukosialin also known as sialophorin or CD43 (cluster of differentiation 43) is a transmembrane cell surface protein that in humans is encoded by the SPN (sialophorin) gene.

Function 

Sialophorin (leukosialin) is a major sialoglycoprotein on the surface of human T lymphocytes, monocytes, granulocytes, and some B lymphocytes, which appears to be important for immune function and may be part of a physiologic ligand-receptor complex involved in T-cell activation.

Clinical significance 
Defects in the CD43 molecule are associated with the development of Wiskott–Aldrich syndrome.  It also appears in about 25% of intestinal MALTomas. Using immunohistochemistry, CD43 can be demonstrated in the paracortical T-cells of healthy lymph nodes and tonsils; it is also positive in a range of lymphoid and myeloid tumours. Although it is present in over 90% of T-cell lymphomas, it is generally less effective at demonstrating this condition than is CD3 antigen. However, it may be useful as part of a panel to demonstrate B-cell lymphoblastic lymphoma, since the malignant cells in this condition are often CD43 positive, and may be difficult to stain with other antibodies. Because it stains granulocytes and their precursors, it is also an effective marker for myeloid tumours.

Interactions 
CD43 has been shown to interact with EZR and Moesin.

References

Further reading

External links 
 
 

Clusters of differentiation
00